Anthony Wallace Gwynne Hadingham (1 March 1913 – 14 July 1986) was an English first-class cricketer active 1931–33 who played for Surrey. He was born in Menton, France; died in Natal, South Africa.

References

1913 births
1986 deaths
English cricketers
Surrey cricketers
Marylebone Cricket Club cricketers
Cambridge University cricketers